King's Highway 53, commonly referred to as Highway 53, was a provincially maintained highway in the southern portion of the Canadian province of Ontario that connected Woodstock to Hamilton via Brantford. The  route served as a southerly bypass to Highway 2, avoiding Paris, Ancaster and Hamilton. In addition to the previously mentioned cities, Highway53 served the communities of Cathcart and Burford.

First designated in 1935, the route remained in place until it was downloaded to local jurisdiction in 1997. For much of its history, the road was concurrent with Highway2 between Woodstock and Eastwood, as well as between Brantford and Ancaster. Today the route is known by various local names, including Oxford County Road55, Brant County Highway53, Wilson Street, Garner Road and Rymal Road. It serves as a viable alternative to Highway2 or Highway403.

Route description 

The route of former Highway53 began in the west at Oxford County Road2, formerly Highway2. From the community of Eastwood, which lies east of Woodstock, the road travelled southeast through farmland as Oxford County Road55 and crosses Highway403, with which there is an interchange.
Soon thereafter, the route entered the community of Muir, at the Oxford County and County of Brant boundary.
East of this point the route is known as Brant County Highway53, where it continued southeast passing through the community of Cathcart. It eventually straightened out and travelled east through Burford. As the road approached Brantford, intersecting Highway 24 (Rest Acres Road), it skirted the southern edge of Brantford Municipal Airport.

Within Brantford, the former highway is now known as Colborne Street, although the section through downtown Brantford is a one-way street; westbound traffic is directed onto Dalhousie Street. The route crossed the Grand River west of downtown, intersecting and becoming concurrent with former Highway2 at Brant Avenue. It intersected the southern terminus pf what is now Wayne Gretzky Parkway, towards the eastern end of town, and eventually crossed a Southern Ontario Railway track into the community of Cainsville. After returning to farmland, the route passed through the community of Langford and soon thereafter entered Hamilton.

History 
Highway53 was created in the mid-1930s to bypass the congested section of Highway2 between Woodstock and Brantford. It was later extended into Hamilton to improve the layout of highways around that city, specifically Highway 20A.

On August14, 1935, the Department of Highways (DHO) assumed the Burford Road, between Highway2 in Eastwood and Highway24 (Mount Pleasant Street) in Brantford, as a provincial highway.
The new Highway53 entered Brantford along Burford Street, turning onto Oxford Street at Welsh Street and becoming concurrent with Highway24 to cross the Grand River. On the opposite side, Highway53 ended at Highway2 (Brant Avenue).
Burford and Oxford streets have since been renamed as Colborne Street West.

In 1937, a series of route renumberings took place in the Hamilton area. Among these was the renumbering of Highway20A, which prior to then followed Upper Gage Avenue to Rymal Road. Rymal Road was also numbered Highway20A from Duff's Corners, south of Ancaster, to Elfrida, at the junction of Rymal Road and Centennial Parkway (Highway20). Following the renumbering, the route north into Hamilton became Highway 55, while Garner Road and Rymal Road became an extension of Highway53. To connect the two sections of the route, a concurrency was established along Highway2 between Brantford and Duff's Corners.
The highway was fully paved by 1939,
though most sections of it were paved when it was commissioned as a provincial highway.
The only unpaved section, between Eastwood and Burford, was paved in 1937 and 1938.

In 1954, the concurrency with Highway2 near Woodstock was discontinued, establishing the western terminus at Eastwood.
The route remained this way until the late-1990s. In 1997, the remainder of Highway 53 was downloaded to Regional Municipality of Oxford County, Brant County, and the City of Hamilton (formerly the Regional Municipality of Hamilton-Wentworth).
The road is now known as Oxford County Road 55, Brant County Highway 53, and Brant County Highway 2/53 (for being co-signed with fellow defunct road Highway 2). In Hamilton, the road is simply known as Rymal Road and Garner Road.
The former is named after William Rymal, (1759–1852), farmer and one of earliest settlers on the Hamilton mountain.

Major intersections

References 

Roads in Hamilton, Ontario
Transport in Brantford
Transport in Woodstock, Ontario
Ontario county roads
053
1935 establishments in Ontario